Carlos Andrés Arano, also known as Chiche Arano (born 6 May 1980 in Avellaneda, Buenos Aires Province), is an Argentinian football player. As of 2020, he plays for Huracán.

External links
 
 Carlos Arano at BDFA.com.ar 
 Carlos Arano – Argentine Primera statistics at Fútbol XXI  

1980 births
Living people
Sportspeople from Avellaneda
Association football defenders
Club Atlético Huracán footballers
Racing Club de Avellaneda footballers
Estudiantes de La Plata footballers
Quilmes Atlético Club footballers
A.C.N. Siena 1904 players
A.C. Perugia Calcio players
Polideportivo Ejido footballers
Aris Thessaloniki F.C. players
Club Atlético River Plate footballers
Argentine Primera División players
Primera Nacional players
Super League Greece players
Argentine expatriate footballers
Argentine footballers
Expatriate footballers in Greece
Expatriate footballers in Italy